The 2016 FIBA Americas League was the ninth edition of the top intercontinental professional club basketball competition in the Americas. Guaros de Lara of Venezuela, won their first FIBA Americas League championship in team history, by beating Bauru of Brazil, by a score of 84–79, in the Grand Final.

Preliminary round

Group A

Group B

Group C

Group D

Quarterfinals

Group E

Group F

Final 4

Semifinals

Third-place game

Grand Final

External links
FIBA Americas League 
FIBA Americas League 
FIBA Americas  
FIBA Liga Americas Twitter 
LatinBasket.com FIBA Americas League 
Liga de las Américas YouTube Channel 

2015–16
2015–16 in South American basketball
2015–16 in North American basketball